Amore e ginnastica (Love And Gymnastics) is a 1973 comedy film directed by Luigi Filippo D'Amico. It is based on a novel with the same name written by Edmondo De Amicis.

Cast 
Lino Capolicchio: Simone Celzani
Senta Berger: Maria Pedani
Adriana Asti: Elena Zibelli
Antonino Faà di Bruno: commendator Celzani
Renzo Marignano: Ingegner Ginoni
: Alfredo Ginoni
: Armando (maestro Fassi)
Rocco D'Assunta: Director of the school
Ester Carloni: Pinuccia (the Celzani house maid)
: Elvira Fassi
Edoardo Toniolo: the minister

Vincenzo Donzelli
Giuliano Todeschini
Giuseppe Alotta
Valeria Sabel

Edda Ferronao
Bruna Cealti

References

External links

1973 films
Italian comedy films
Films directed by Luigi Filippo D'Amico
Films based on Italian novels
Films based on works by Edmondo De Amicis
Films set in the 1890s
Films with screenplays by Suso Cecchi d'Amico
Films scored by Armando Trovajoli
1973 comedy films
1970s Italian-language films
1970s Italian films